Exchange Student Zero is an Australian television film that premiered on 16 December 2012 on Cartoon Network. Created by Bruce Kane with Maurice Argiro and produced by Bogan Entertainment Solutions, in association with Cartoon Network Asia Pacific, it is the first local animated made production to be commissioned by the channel.

A TV series based on the film was announced as the first Cartoon Network show produced in Australia, where the two original creators joins Patrick Crawley. It premiered in the Asia-Pacific region on 26 September 2015, and the setting was changed from Perth, Australia to a U.S. town called South Port.

Voice cast

Film (2012)

Main

 Dee Bradley Baker - Amonsun, Monsters
 Natalie Bond - Lucinda, Anime Girls #1
 Patrick Crawley - Biology Teacher, Real Exchange Student
 Marg Downey - Peg, Happy Peach Flower, Drama Teacher
 Scott Edgar - Principal Rogerson
 Mark Hamill - King Karuta, King Blackyard
 Edwin Kane - Leroy
 Kate McLennan - Charity, Anime Girls #2
 Rove McManus - Hiro, John, Max, Lionel, Coach
 Candi Milo - Avere, Queen Karuta, Queen Blackyard
 Peter Rowsthorn - Denmead
 Jon Von Goes - Sot Sloane

Additional

 Gene Argiro
 Ginger Argiro
 Giles Brading
 Patrick Crawley
 Shona Elliot-Kerr
 Serena Kane
 Indigo Malatt
 Molly McCusker
 Judy Whittle
 Astra Whitton

Series (2015)

 Ashleigh Ball - Charity, Peg
 Jacqueline Brennan - Queen Blackyard,Avere,Happy Peach Flower, Queen Karuta, Old Lady
 Patrick Crawley - Papa Rainbow, Zoobooninian, Doolsworth Farnstickle, Wrestler
 Scott Edgar - Principal Rogerson
 Keegan Connor Tracy - Lucinda
 Maryke Hendrikse - Ms. Dunwall
 Jessica Hopcraft - Gunk Queen
 Rove McManus - Hiro, Max, Coach Coach, Stinky
 Scott McNeil - Headmaster, Lionel, King Karuta
 Toby Moore - Principal Kipling, Announcer
 Lee Tockar - Amonsun
 Vincent Tong - John, Nephlan 1
 Sam Vincent - Denmead, Hank, Nephlan 2

Film

Series

References

External links
 
  (2012 film)
  (2015 series)

Cartoon Network television films
International Cartoon Network original programming
2012 television films
2012 films
2010s Australian animated films
2015 Australian television series debuts
2010s animated television series
2010s Australian animated television series
Australian children's animated action television series
Australian children's animated fantasy television series
Australian television films
Australian animated feature films